Lennart Thorvald Strömberg (17 March 1931 – 9 December 2010) was a Finnish sprint canoeist who competed at the 1952 and 1956 Olympics in the individual 1000 m and 10,000 m events. He won a gold and a silver medal in 1952 and placed fourth over 10,000 m in 1956.

Strömberg also won three medals at the ICF Canoe Sprint World Championships with two golds (K-1 10000 m: 1950, 1958) and a silver (K-1 1000 m: 1950).

After retiring from competitions Strömberg was the chairman of his canoe club in Ekenäs and a member of the Finnish canoe/kayak federation. In 2000, he received a Pro-sports award from the Finnish ministry of education.

References

External links

1931 births
2010 deaths
People from Kirkkonummi
Swedish-speaking Finns
Canoeists at the 1952 Summer Olympics
Canoeists at the 1956 Summer Olympics
Finnish male canoeists
Olympic canoeists of Finland
Olympic gold medalists for Finland
Olympic silver medalists for Finland
Olympic medalists in canoeing
ICF Canoe Sprint World Championships medalists in kayak
Medalists at the 1952 Summer Olympics
Sportspeople from Uusimaa